SES-4 is a communications satellite operated by SES World Skies, then by SES S.A.

Spacecraft 
SES-4 was built by Space Systems/Loral (SSL), and is based on the SSL-1300 satellite bus. It has a design life of fifteen years.

Launch 
It was launched on 14 February 2012, at 19:36:37 UTC on a Proton-M / Briz-M launch vehicle, the launch was arranged by International Launch Services (ILS), since Baikonour, Site 200/39.

Mission 
It is positioned at 22° West orbital location over Atlantic Ocean, replacing NSS-7.

References 

Communications satellites in geostationary orbit
Spacecraft launched in 2012
SES satellites
Satellites of Luxembourg